R... Rajkumar is a 2013 Indian Hindi-language action film written and directed by Prabhu Deva. The film stars Shahid Kapoor, Sonakshi Sinha and Sonu Sood.

Plot 
Romeo Rajkumar is an aimless youth who arrives in Dhartipur, a small town ruled by two drug barons named Shivraj Gurjar and his arch-enemy Manik Parmar, controlled by a Mafia don named Ajit Taaka, who operates in Hong Kong. Rajkumar begins working for Shivraj. But his life changes forever when he claps his eyes on the beautiful, educated Chanda. Unknown to him, Chanda is an orphan who is being raised by her uncle Manik Parmar.

After some persistent wooing, Chanda falls for Rajkumar's charms. Just when their love was about to flourish, Shivraj sees Chanda emerging from water while praying & lusts her wet body. In the meanwhile, he compromises with Parmar, and Parmar decides to get Chanda married to Shivraj, against Chanda's wish. Angered, Rajkumar beats Shivraj's men and challenges him, saying that he will marry Chanda in front of Shivraj. Shivraj tries a lot to impress Chanda but keeps failing. Chanda one day gets angry and challenges Shivraj with Rajkumar. She says that she will strip her clothes, herself, only if Shivraj defeats Rajkumar. Furious, Shivraj plans to get Rajkumar killed in an encounter by his pet police officer. But in return, he gets a shocking surprise when it is revealed that Rajkumar actually works for Don Ajit Takka and was sent to Dhartipur only to take over the drug cartel to which Both Shivraj and Parmar owe allegiance. Rajkumar captures Shivraj's truck full of drugs and drives it to Taaka.

After giving Shivraj's stolen truck to Takka, he discovers that the truck was empty. In a twist of events, it turns out that Shivraj and Takka had joined hands, and purposely made Rajkumar steal the empty truck. Shivraj brutally kills Rajkumar and has his men bury him.

Shivraj starts his wedding celebrations with Chanda, only to be interrupted by the still alive Rajkumar, who is shown to have been rescued by Shivraj's henchmen Qamar Ali after he was buried. Shivraj's men back off, because they are now friends with Rajkumar, hence leading to a one-on-one fight between the two. Shivraj overpowers Rajkumar for the majority of the fight. Finally, Rajkumar kills Shivraj with a power punch to the throat and later kills Don Takka with a ceramic tile. After killing, he marries Chanda. The film ends with all the men led by Qamar Ali beating Parmar and Shivraj's remaining allies, while a severely injured Rajkumar and Chanda walk away happily hand in hand.

Cast
 Shahid Kapoor as Romeo Rajkumar
 Sonakshi Sinha as Chanda 
 Sonu Sood as Shivraj Gurjar
 Ashish Vidyarthi as Manik Parmar
 Asrani as Pandit
 Mukul Dev as Qamar Ali
 Srihari as Ajit Taaka
 Poonam Jhawer as Bindu
 Ashok Samarth as Inspector
 G. V. Sudhakar Naidu
 Vijay Patkar as Chatur Singh
 Charmy Kaur (Special appearance in song "Gandi Baat")
 Prabhu Deva (Special appearance in song "Gandi Baat")
 Ragini Dwivedi (Special appearance in song "Kaddu Katega")
 Scarlett Mellish Wilson (Special appearance in song "Kaddu Katega")

Production

Sonakshi Sinha performed some action scenes in the film. Charmy Kaur shot for an item song "Gandi Baat" for the film in June 2013. Kannada actress Ragini Dwivedi made her Bollywood entry (only Bollywood film at moment) in the item song "Kaddu Katega" which also featured Scarlett Mellish Wilson and only her Bollywood film at the moment.

The film was first titled Rambo Rajkumar which is also the name of a veteran stunt director from south India. According to reports, the makers of the original Rambo series had copyrighted the word Rambo making it unavailable for usage by other filmmakers. As a result, the makers decided on a title change for the film. However, since the film's title is already known among the audience, the makers decided on dropping a few letters from the title, rechristening it to R... Rajkumar. After the film's title change, Shahid Kapoor's character in the film, which was Rambo Rajkumar initially, was also changed. During its filming, Kapoor narrowly avoided serious burns during a stunt sequence. Song sequence was shot at Great Rann of Kutch.

After the film's release and subsequent success, the Academy of Motion Picture Arts and Sciences, which oversees the famous Academy Awards, sent a formal letter to producer Viki Rajani asking for a copy of the film's script to be kept in the Oscar Library. This is the fifth Bollywood film, after Lagaan, Heroes, Rock On!!, and Guzaarish, to be requested for this honor by the Academy. Speaking of the request, Viki Rajani said, "It's a privilege that our movie script has been recognized internationally and it's an honour for us to be a part of the archives at the Academy Library. The movies was loved by the audience and has done well at the box-office. This is another happy moment for the entire team." Director Prabhu Deva, speaking of the request, said, "Making this movies has been a fun experience and this honour tops it all. What more can I ask for."

Music

The soundtrack of the film was composed by Pritam. The first song of the film "Gandi Baat" was released on 16 October, which is sung by Mika Singh and Kalpana Patowary. The other song released was "Saree Ke Fall Sa", sung by Antara Mitra and Nakash Aziz. The entire album, consisting of six tracks composed by Pritam, with lyrics by Anupam Amod and Mayur Puri, was released physically on 6 November 2013. The music recording engineer was Sukumar Dutta.

Reception

Critical response

India Times rated 3/5 stated, "It has some 'must-haves' of a pot-boiler, but misses the real thing – a solid story." Tushar Joshi of Daily News and Analysis gave 3 out of 5 stars to the film and said, "Watch it if you are in the mood for a loud no-brainer that relies on formulaic over the top entertainment." Indian express criticized the film saying "R for Rubbish". Rajeev Masand criticised the film that it is "relentlessly ugly, you have to wonder how it qualifies as entertainment of any sort" and gave a rating "half out of five for Prabhu Deva's 'R... Rajkumar'. The half star is strictly for Pritam's music". Anupama Chopra of Hindustan Times called it "cheerfully, boisterously regressive" and also claimed that "The story is both abysmal and exhaustingly loud because when the hero isn't doing pyar, pyar, pyar, he's indulging in maar, maar, maar and men – defying every law of physics – are flying in all directions. Taran Adarsh of Bollywood Hungama wrote:" R... RAJKUMAR doesn't work. It is Prabhu Dheva's weakest Hindi film to date".

References

External links 

 
 

2013 films
2010s romantic action films
Indian romantic action films
2010s Hindi-language films
Films directed by Prabhu Deva
Films featuring songs by Pritam
Films set in Madhya Pradesh